Ryosuke Sakai (堺亮介, Sakai Ryōsuke, born 24 July 1997) is a Japanese trampoline gymnast. He competed in the 2020 Summer Olympics.

References

1997 births
Living people
People from Isehara, Kanagawa
Sportspeople from Tokyo
Gymnasts at the 2020 Summer Olympics
Japanese male trampolinists
Olympic gymnasts of Japan
20th-century Japanese people
21st-century Japanese people